Hiltingbury is an area within the Borough of Eastleigh in Hampshire, England. There are two electoral wards representing Hiltingbury, returning a total of four councillors to the Borough Council.

Education
Hiltingbury Junior and Infant Schools share the same campus.  The junior school opened in 1967, initially with six classes serving 201 children; today there are twelve classes, with 396 children.  The infant school has nine classrooms, and takes on a maximum of 90 Year R children each year in three reception classes.

References

External links
Hiltingbury Community Association
Hiltingbury Infant School
Hiltingbury Junior School

Borough of Eastleigh